Inocencio Aniceto Transportation, more fondly known as St. Joseph, is a bus transportation company in the Philippines owned by the Aniceto Family of Vigan City in Ilocos Sur province. It operates a 24/7 service for passengers between Metro Manila and northwest Luzon (the Ilocos corridor).

Etymology
The name of the company was derived from its founder, Inocencio Aniceto, a native of Ilocos Sur.

History

The company was founded as a family business of the Aniceto family, which also operates a hotel in Vigan, the "Aniceto Mansion Hotel". It has become one of the most popular means of traveling to Manila, alongside Philippine Rabbit, the former Times Transit, and the now-defunct Maura Transit (the ruins of its former terminal is just two houses away from Times' (now Dominion's) Vigan terminal, itself a block away from St Joseph's Vigan terminal). During the '80s they operated one of the country's most modern fleets, with top-of-the-line and state-of-the-art buses, as well as, in 1982, the first bus company in the country to deploy MAN Royal Commuter Service buses manufactured by Delta Motors Corporation; and being one of the first few bus companies in Northern Luzon to field Hino "Grandtheater" buses.

During the 90's, financial problems put the company on hard times. The owners had to sell almost all of their buses (including newly acquired Mercedes-Benz units) to Autobus Transport Systems.

The firm did not die totally. Even if most of the company's assets were sold in order to somehow gain its loses, Dr. Rodolfo Aniceto, together with his wife, did a herculean task to restore the company. The company was reborn when they acquired a new fleet of surplus buses from Japan (which includes Isuzu Super Cruisers, Hino S'elegas, Hino Blue Ribbons, and a Mitsubishi Fuso Aero Queen) and has returned to some of its old routes.

In 2010, the Aniceto Bus Line acquired the "Wheels of Fortune Transport" tourist bus company, along with a few of its buses, which later became "Aniceto Travel Services," in order to cater to the company's ever-growing charter service.

In late October 2011, the company started servicing the Baguio-Vigan route for the first time.

In the early months of 2017, the bus company started to deploy its newly acquired King Long buses.

Fleet
Hino Selega

Hino Blue Ribbon

Isuzu Super Cruiser

Fuso Aero Bus

Hyundai Aero

King Long

Bus companies of the Philippines